The 2019–20 Antigua and Barbuda Premier Division was the 49th season of the Antigua and Barbuda Premier Division, the top division football competition in Antigua and Barbuda. The season began on 26 October 2019, and was scheduled to conclude on 22 March 2020.

On 12 March 2020, the season was suspended due to concerns with the COVID-19 pandemic.

Teams

Table

Results

Stadiums

References

External links 

 Official website 

1
Antigua and Barbuda
Antigua and Barbuda Premier Division seasons
Antigua and barbuda